William John Bushby (born 26 September 1935) is an English former cricketer. He was a right-handed batsman who bowled right-arm medium pace. He was born in Southwick, Sussex.

Bushby made his debut for Bedfordshire against Shropshire in the 1961 Minor Counties Championship. He played minor counties cricket for Bedfordshire from 1961 to 1975, making 80 Minor Counties Championship appearances. He made his List A debut against Northamptonshire in the 1967 Gillette Cup. He made 5 further List A appearances, the last of which came against Lancashire in the 1973 Gillette Cup. In his 6 List A matches, he scored 110 runs at an average of 27.50, with a high score of 80 not out. This score was against Essex in the 1971 Gillette Cup. With the ball, he took 4 wickets at a bowling average of 56.00, with best figures of 2/10.

References

External links

1935 births
Living people
People from Southwick, West Sussex
English cricketers
Bedfordshire cricketers